Camera Obscura is a journal of feminism, culture, and media studies published by Duke University Press, Durham, North Carolina. Published three times per year, the journal focuses on "the conjunctions of gender, race, class, and sexuality with audiovisual culture; new histories and theories of film, television, video, and digital media; and politically engaged approaches to a range of media practices." It was founded in 1976 by four graduate students at the University of California, Berkeley: Janet Bergstrom, Sandy Flitterman, Elisabeth Lyon, and Constance Penley. The four co-founders had met while working on the magazine Women and Film.

In its early years, the journal centered on film as its object of analysis, and strove to use "new approaches in feminist, cultural, and critical theory to rethink cinema, as well as, notably, using cinema to rethink feminism and critical theory." In 1995, the journal's subtitle was changed from "A Journal of Feminism and Film Theory" to "Feminism, Culture, and Media Studies" to reflect that its interests had developed beyond semiotic and psychoanalytic theories to include approaches such as industrial and historical analyses, genre and star studies, ethnographic and reception models, analyses of race and ethnicity, postcolonial theory and critiques of empire, and queer and trans studies.

Camera Obscura has included articles by such contributors as Yvonne Rainer, Chantal Akerman, Raymond Bellour, Christian Metz, Jean-François Lyotard, Marguerite Duras, Mary Ann Doane, Kaja Silverman, Laura Mulvey, Trinh T. Minh-ha, Constance Penley, and E. Ann Kaplan.

See also
 List of film periodicals

References

1976 establishments in North Carolina
Duke University Press academic journals
Feminism in the United States
Feminist magazines
Film studies journals
Magazines established in 1976
Magazines published in North Carolina
Triannual magazines published in the United States
Mass media in Durham, North Carolina